Chiarella v. United States, 445 U.S. 222 (1980), is a case in which the Supreme Court of the United States held that an employee of a printer handling corporate takeover bids who deduced target companies' identities and dealt in their stock without disclosing his knowledge of impending takeovers, had not violated § 10(b) of the Securities Exchange Act of 1934 and SEC Rule 10b-5.

Background
After working in a position that gave petitioner Vincent Chiarella inside information on particular corporate takeover bids, the Securities and Exchanges Commission (SEC) investigated his trading activities. Chiarella and the SEC allegedly came to an agreement where Chiarella "agreed to return the profits he made in the sellers of the shares." A short time after, he was indicted on seventeen counts of violating the Securities Exchange Act of 1934.

Question before the Court
Did Chiaraella "violate Section 10(b) of the 1934 Act by failing to disclose the impending takeover before trading in the target company's securities?"

Decision of the Court
In a 6–3 decision in favor of Chiarella, Justice Powell wrote the opinion of the Supreme Court. The Court held that  "a duty to disclose under section 10(b) does not arise from the mere possession of nonpublic market information." Chiarella had no "fiduciary relationship" with either company, nor was he an agent of either company, Chiarella had no duty to disclose the privileged information, and he did not receive confidential information from the targeted companies.

References

External links
 

1980 in United States case law
United States securities case law
United States Supreme Court cases
United States Supreme Court cases of the Burger Court